
Gmina Bargłów Kościelny is a rural gmina (administrative district) in Augustów County, Podlaskie Voivodeship, in north-eastern Poland.

Villages
Gmina Bargłów Kościelny contains the villages and settlements of Bargłów Dworny, Bargłów Kościelny, Bargłówka, Barszcze, Brzozówka, Bułkowizna, Dręstwo, Górskie, Judziki, Komorniki, Kresy, Kroszewo, Kroszówka, Kukowo, Łabętnik, Lipowo, Nowa Kamionka, Nowiny Bargłowskie, Pieńki, Pomiany, Popowo, Pruska, Reszki, Rumiejki, Solistówka, Sosnowo, Stara Kamionka, Stare Nowiny, Stare Tajno, Tajenko, Tajno Łanowe, Tajno Podjeziorne, Wólka Karwowska and Źrobki.

Neighbouring gminas
Gmina Bargłów Kościelny is bordered by the gminas of Augustów, Goniądz, Kalinowo, Rajgród and Sztabin.

References

Barglow Koscielny
Augustów County